Scared Famous is a horror reality television series hosted by Redman. It features ten cast members from various VH1 shows competing in horror-themed challenges inside a haunted house in Savannah, Georgia for a prize of up to $100,000 for their favorite charity.

Summary
Ten contestants move into a house haunted by two twins and various demonic forces in Savannah, Georgia, in order to win a prize of up to US$100,000 donated to a charity in their name. This prize is won by completing various "horror movie-inspired" Scream Team Challenges worth different amounts of money. Near the end of each episode, one celebrity is voted to be put up for elimination by the others as a "dead weight" and must compete against another contestant of their choice in the various "Devil Jeopardy" elimination challenges. The loser of this challenge is eliminated and "killed", until only one remains, receiving what they had earned in all of the Scream Team Challenges they had completed throughout the competition.

Contestants

Progress chart
Season 1 (2017)

: From episode three onward, the Devil Jeopardy elimination challenge ends on a cliffhanger, with the results of who is deemed "killed" shown in the following episode. 

: Sky won the ultimate power to choose the two contestants to participate in the Devil Jeopardy elimination challenge, she chose Erica and Safaree. The other guests were forbidden from the vote.

: From this point on the winner of Devil Jeopardy elimination challenge will no longer receive immunity.

: Erica was voted back into the competition by fellow eliminated guest.

: The last episode was divided into three challenges. Erica won the first challenge and the ultimate power to eliminate a contestant immediately, she decided to eliminate Eva. Don won the second challenge and the ultimate power to choose one contestant to the finals, he chose Sky.

 Color key
  - Passed - The guests won the scream team challenge and had money added to their bank.
  - Failed - The guests lost the scream team challenge, thus no money was added to their bank.
  - Bonus - The final winner had money added to their bank by bonus.
The value in bold signifies how much that challenge was worth.
  – Winner - The guest won the competition.
  – Power - The guest won the challenge and the ultimate power to choose the two contestants to participate in the Devil Jeopardy elimination challenge or to eliminate the contestants immediately.
  – Safe - The guest was not voted as a "dead weight" and was not picked by the dead weight to go to the Devil Jeopardy elimination.
  – Risk - The guest was either voted into the Devil Jeopardy elimination as the "dead weight" or picked by them to compete against them but won the challenge.
  – Immune - The guest who was voted into the Devil Jeopardy elimination, and won, thus giving them immunity from being voted into the next round's elimination.
  – Return - Previously "dead" guest is voted back into the competition by fellow eliminated guests.
  – Dead - The guest was either voted into the Devil Jeopardy elimination as the "dead weight" or picked by them to compete against, and lost, thus "killed" off the show. They would appear in later episodes as "ghosts".

Episodes

Season 1 (2017)

See also
 Escape the Night

 13: Fear Is Real

 Hellevator

References

External links
 Official website

2010s American reality television series
2017 American television series debuts
Television shows set in Savannah, Georgia
VH1 original programming
English-language television shows